The FreeX Arrow is a German single-place, paraglider that was designed and produced by FreeX of Egling in the mid-2000s. It is now out of production.

Design and development
The Arrow was designed as an advanced and competition glider.

The glider is DHV certified. Like all FreeX wings it features internal diagonal bracing.

Specifications (Arrow)

References

Arrow
Paragliders